Methven is a surname. Notable people with the surname include:

 Charlie Methven, former editor of The Daily Telegraph's Spy column and part owner of Sunderland AFC
 Colin Methven, Scottish footballer
 Henry Stewart, 1st Lord Methven, third husband of Margaret Tudor
 Jessie C. Methven, Scottish suffragette
 Jimmy Methven, Scottish footballer
 Mildred Methvin, American judge
 Myrtis Methvin, Louisiana politician
 Robert Methven Petrie, Canadian astronomer
 Tom Methven, New Zealand footballer

See also
 Methuen (surname)